Achille was a French Navy  of the M6 ​​series commissioned in 1933. She participated in World War II until she was scuttled in June 1940.

Characteristics

Achille was part of a fairly homogeneous series of 31 deep-sea patrol submarines also called "1,500-tonners" because of their displacement. All entered service between 1931 and 1939.

They displaced  on the surface and  underwater. When submerged, their two electric motors produced a combined  and allowed them to reach .

Construction and commissioning

Laid down at Arsenal de Brest in Brest, France, on 1 September 1928 with the hull number Q147, Achille was launched on 28 May 1930. She was commissioned on 29 June 1933.

Service history

1933–1939

Achille arrived at Brest, France, on 5 August 1936. In 1937, she received orders to conduct a cruise to Douala in French Cameroon with her sister ship  to test the endurance of French submariners and their equipment. On 26 March 1938, she departed France for a cruise to Port-Gentil in Gabon, at the time a territory of French Equatorial Africa.

World War II

At the start of World War II in September 1939, Achille was assigned to the 2nd Submarine Division in the 4th Submarine Squadron in the 1st Flotilla, a component of the Forces de haute mer (High Seas Force), based at Brest. Her sister ships , Pasteur, and  made up the rest of the division.

On 14 September 1939, the four submarines of the 2nd Submarine Division as well as their sister ships  and  received orders to establish a standing patrol off the coast of Spain. The six submarines spent six weeks patrolling off Vigo, where part of the German merchant fleet — which the Allies suspected of serving as supply ships for German U-boats — had taken refuge at the start of the war. Before their patrols ended on 30 October 1939, the six French submarines had spent a combined 67 days at sea on patrol in very harsh conditions with no results.

On 14 November 1939, the 2nd Submarine Division received orders to proceed to Halifex, Nova Scotia, Canada, to take part in Allied convoy operations in the Atlantic Ocean. During the winter of 1939–1940, the submarines  escorted three convoys from Halifex to the United Kingdom in difficult weather conditions.

Beginning on 22 March 1940, the division was based at Harwich on the North Sea coast of England. From Dundee, the submarines operated in the North Sea in support of Allied forces fighting in the Norwegian campaign as German forces began their conquest of Norway. While departing Dundee on 18 April 1940, Achille collided with Pasteur, damaging one of Pasteur′s diving planes and one of her propeller shafts. Shortly afterward, Achille almost torpedoed Sfax before her commanding officer identified Sfax as one of her sister ships arriving to relieve Achille on her patrol station.

From 7 to 20 May 1940, Achille, Casabianca, and Sfax patrolled off Bergen, Stavanger, and Ergersund, Norway, with Achille beginning a patrol in the Skagerrak on 7 May. While she was returning from this patrol, a British bomber mistook her for a German submarine and attacked her in Dundee Channel, dropping five bombs. Achille suffered serious damage, particularly to her ballast tanks, propeller shafts, and hydrophones. She proceeded to Brest for repairs, arriving there on 29 May 1940. She began a major refit at Brest on 14 June 1940.

German ground forces advanced into France on 10 May 1940, beginning the Battle of France, and Italy declared war on France on 10 June 1940 and joined the invasion. Achille was in drydock and unable to move under her own power as German forces approached Brest. To prevent the Germans from capturing her, she was scuttled at Brest at 19:00 on 18 June 1940. Her wreck later was refloated to clear her berth.

References

Citations

Bibliography

 
 
 
 

Redoutable-class submarines (1928)
1930 ships
Ships built in France
World War II submarines of France
Maritime incidents in April 1940
Maritime incidents in May 1940
Maritime incidents in June 1940
Friendly fire incidents of World War II
Shipwrecks of France
Lost submarines of France
Scuttled vessels